Sulur is a town in Tamil Nadu, India.

Sulur may also refer to:
 Sulur taluk, an administrative unit of Tamil Nadu, India
 Sulur Block
 Sulur (state assembly constituency)
 Sulur Air Force Station
 Sulur Road railway station
 Sulur, Karnataka, a village in Kolar district, Karnataka, India
 Súlur, a mountain in Iceland
 , a railway station in Grobogan Regency, Indonesia

See also 
 Salur (disambiguation)
 Solor
 Silur